Our Lady of Mount Carmel Secondary School is a Catholic separate school in Mississauga, Ontario. It is part of the Dufferin-Peel Catholic District School Board and is affiliated with the parish of St. John of the Cross.
The Trustee is Brea Corbet and the Current Principal is Mr. Lezon. The school has approximately 1,750 students.

The school also boasts numerous committees and clubs to encourage extra curricular participation amongst the student body such as the Photography club, Drama club or Student Council.  Some clubs have special events within the school such as the Health Club; Pro-Life Club participates in the March for Life in Ottawa, Ontario; and the Comic Book Club writes, draws, and publishes their own comic books.

The school's Boys Senior Hockey Team were OFSAA Champions in 2002, 2003 and 2006.

The Punk rock band Billy Talent was formed by students at the school in 1993, originally under the name Pezz.

Notable alumni and notable students
 Tré Armstrong - judge on So You Think You Can Dance Canada
 Devon Bailey -  Canadian Football League professional football player
 Tebor Brosch - Canadian professional boxer
 Ian D'Sa - member of punk rock band Billy Talent
 Kyle Forgeard - co-founder of the popular Youtube channel 'NELK
 Jonathan Gallant - member of the punk rock band Billy Talent
 Raye Hartmann - Canadian Football League professional football player
 Benjamin Kowalewicz - member of the punk rock band Billy Talent
 Matt Moulson - NHL professional hockey player (Buffalo Sabres)
 Ese Mrabure-Ajufo - Canadian Football League professional football player
 Aaron Solowoniuk - member of punk rock band Billy Talent

See also
List of high schools in Ontario

References

External links

Our Lady of Mount Carmel Secondary School Website
Dufferin-Peel Catholic District School Board

High schools in Mississauga
Catholic secondary schools in Ontario
Educational institutions established in 1987
1987 establishments in Ontario